Attica is a 1980 television film directed by Marvin J. Chomsky. It stars Morgan Freeman, Henry Darrow, Charles Durning, Joel Fabiani and Anthony Zerbe. It depicts the events leading up to and during the 1971 Attica Correctional Facility riot and the aftermath.

Cast
Henry Darrow as Herman Badillo
Charles Durning as Commissioner Russell Oswald
Joel Fabiani as Senator Gordon Conners
Morgan Freeman as Hap Richards
George Grizzard as Tom Wicker
Roger E. Mosley as Frank Green
Anthony Zerbe as William Kunstler
David Harris as T. J.
Arlen Dean Snyder as Superintendent Vince Mancusi
Glynn Turman as Raymond Franklin

Nominations and awards

The film was nominated for five Primetime Emmys and eventually won one (for Outstanding Directing, Marvin J. Chomsky).

References

External links

1980 television films
1980 films
Films directed by Marvin J. Chomsky
Attica Correctional Facility
Films set in 1971
Films scored by Gil Mellé